The 2022 Asia Cup (also known as DP World Asia Cup for sponsorship reasons) was the 15th edition of the Asia Cup cricket tournament, with the matches played as Twenty20 Internationals (T20Is) during August and September 2022 in the United Arab Emirates. Originally scheduled to be held in September 2020, the tournament was postponed in July 2020 due to the COVID-19 pandemic. It was then rescheduled to take place in Sri Lanka in June 2021, before being postponed once again. Pakistan was scheduled to host the tournament after retaining the rights to host the 2022 edition. However, in October 2021, the Asian Cricket Council (ACC) announced that Sri Lanka would host the tournament in 2022, with Pakistan hosting the 2023 edition. India were the defending champions, and were eliminated in the Super Four stage in this edition. Sri Lanka beat Pakistan by 23 runs in the final, to win their sixth title and their first in T20I format. 

On 21 July 2022, Sri Lanka Cricket (SLC) informed the ACC that they would not be in a position to host the tournament due to the economic and political crisis in the country. On 27 July 2022, the ACC confirmed that the tournament would be played in the United Arab Emirates, with Sri Lanka Cricket serving as the tournament's hosts. The fixtures for the tournament were announced on 2 August 2022.

Background
In December 2018, the Pakistan Cricket Board (PCB) were granted the rights to host the tournament by the Asian Cricket Council (ACC). However, it was unclear if the matches will be played in Pakistan or the United Arab Emirates. After the announcement was made, the Board of Control for Cricket in India (BCCI) requested that the PCB change the event's venue due to ongoing security concerns. Pakistan last held a multi-team international tournament in 2008, with the 2008 Asia Cup. Since then, only a handful of international matches have taken place in Pakistan following the 2009 attack on the Sri Lanka national cricket team.

In May 2019, the ACC confirmed that Pakistan will host the tournament. The decision to host the tournament in Pakistan raised doubts over India's participation, with the ongoing political tension between the two countries. In October 2019, the decision to host the tournament in Pakistan was still to be agreed by the ACC, due to doubts raised over India's participation. In January 2020, various news outlets reported that Pakistan would not be hosting the tournament, due to their ongoing political tensions with India.

On 28 February 2020, the BCCI President Sourav Ganguly stated that "the Asia Cup will be held in Dubai and both India and Pakistan will play." The following day, Ehsan Mani Chairman of the PCB, contradicted Ganguly's statement, saying that the venue has not been finalised. Initially, The ACC was scheduled to meet on 3 March 2020 to discuss the location of the tournament, but the meeting was moved back until the end of March due to the COVID-19 pandemic. On 7 March, Mani said that the tournament would be played at a neutral venue. The following month, he admitted that the tournament may not take place at all due to the pandemic.

In June 2020, following a meeting with the ACC, the PCB said they would be willing to let Sri Lanka host the tournament, with India unwilling to travel to Pakistan. The ACC issued a press release following the meeting stating that "in light of the impact and consequences of the COVID-19 pandemic, possible venue options for the Asia Cup 2020 were discussed and it was decided to take the final decision in due course". In July 2020, an official announcement of the postponement was made by the ACC. In March 2021, the tournament was at risk of a further postponement after India qualified for the final of the World Test Championship, which clashed with the proposed dates in June.

The qualifier tournament had been postponed in July 2020. In May 2021, the ACC confirmed that there would be no Asia Cup in 2021, with that edition of the tournament deferred until 2023. In October 2021, following a meeting with the ACC, Ramiz Raja confirmed that Pakistan would host the following tournament in 2023, with Sri Lanka hosting the 2022 edition. A qualification tournament was played in August 2022.

On 17 July 2022, due to the economic crisis in Sri Lanka and mass protests across the country, the Secretary of SLC Mohan de Silva stated that the tournament will be hosted in the United Arab Emirates.

Teams and qualifications

The qualifier tournament was contested in August 2022, by the UAE and Kuwait, who progressed from the 2020 ACC Western Region T20, as well as Singapore and Hong Kong, who came through the 2020 ACC Eastern Region T20. Hong Kong qualified for the main event after a first-place finish in the qualifier.

Squads

India also named Deepak Chahar, Shreyas Iyer and Axar Patel as standby players. The ACC extended the deadline for squad announcements from 8 August to 11 August 2022 following a request from the  Bangladesh Cricket Board. Bangladesh also named Mrittunjoy Chowdhury, Ripon Mondol and Soumya Sarkar as standby players. Afghanistan also named Qais Ahmad, Sharafuddin Ashraf and Nijat Masood as reserve players. Binura Fernando and Kasun Rajitha were ruled out due to injury shortly after being named into the squad and were replaced by Asitha Fernando and Pramod Madushan respectively. On 20 August 2022, Pakistan bowler Shaheen Afridi was ruled out of the tournament due to a knee injury, and was replaced by Mohammad Hasnain. On 22 August 2022, Nurul Hasan and Hasan Mahmud were ruled out due to injuries and Mohammad Naim was added to the Bangladesh squad. On 26 August 2022, Mohammad Wasim was ruled out due to side strain and Hasan Ali was named as his replacement. On 2 September 2022, Ravindra Jadeja was ruled out of the tournament due to a right knee injury, with Axar Patel added to the Indian squad as his replacement.

Venues

Group stage

Group A

Group B

Super Four

Final

Statistics

Most runs

Most wickets

Notes

References

External links
 Series home at ESPNcricinfo

Asia Cup
International cricket competitions in 2022

Asia Cup
Asia Cup
Asia Cup